Hilton Roy Schleman (1905 – 10 February 1952) was an English publicity agent and author who wrote several book collections on jazz music.

Schleman was a record company publicity agent for United Artists in London. His book Rhythm on Record: A Complete Survey and Register of All the Principal Recorded Dance Music from 1906 to 1936, and a Who's Who of the Artists Concerned in the Making, which was printed in 1936 by Melody Maker and reprinted in 1978 by Greenwood Press remains a noted work on jazz music.

In 1940, Schleman married Jean Frances Winifred Phyllis Lockhart (1909–1987), known as Freda Bruce Lockhart, an actress and film critic. They appear to have separated by the time of his death in 1952, as probate on his estate valued at £6,715 was granted to May MacGregor, single woman.

References

1905 births
1952 deaths
English music historians
Discographers